Rafael Miranda Fernandes (born April 23, 1986) is a Brazilian professional baseball pitcher for the Ibaraki Astro Planets of the Baseball Challenge League. He has played in Nippon Professional Baseball (NPB) for the Tokyo Yakult Swallows.

Career

Tokyo Yakult Swallows
Fernandes signed with the Tokyo Yakult Swallows of Nippon Professional Baseball in 2009. He made his NPB debut on August 6, 2011. In 10 NPB games, from 2011 to 2012, Fernandes pitched to a 1-0 record and 8.31 ERA with 4 strikeouts. He became a free agent after the 2013 season.

Canberra Cavalry
Fernandes signed with the Canberra Cavalry of the Australian Baseball League for the 2015/2016 season. He recorded a 2-3 record and 5.61 ERA with 36 strikeouts in 13 games.

Ibaraki Astro Planets
On April 17, 2021, Fernandes signed with the Ibaraki Astro Planets of the Baseball Challenge League.

Representing Brazil
He represented Brazil at the 2003 Baseball World Cup, 2005 Baseball World Cup and 2013 World Baseball Classic.

References

External links

1986 births
Living people
Brazilian expatriate baseball players in Japan
Nippon Professional Baseball pitchers
Sportspeople from São Paulo
Tokyo Yakult Swallows players
2013 World Baseball Classic players
Brazilian expatriate baseball players in Australia
Canberra Cavalry players